Celsus (Kélsos) was a 2nd-century Greek philosopher and opponent of early Christianity. His literary work, The True Word (also Account, Doctrine or Discourse;), survives exclusively in quotations from it in Contra Celsum, a refutation written in 248 by Origen of Alexandria. The True Word is the earliest known comprehensive criticism of Christianity. Hanegraaff has argued that it was written shortly after the death of Justin Martyr (who was possibly the first Christian apologist), and was probably a response to his work. Origen stated that Celsus was from the first half of the 2nd century AD, although the majority of modern scholars have come to a general consensus that Celsus probably wrote around AD 170 to 180.

Philosophy 
All that is known about Celsus personally is what comes from the surviving text of his book and from what Origen says about him. Although Origen initially refers to Celsus as an Epicurean, his arguments reflect ideas of the Platonic tradition, rather than Epicureanism. Origen attributes this to Celsus's inconsistency, but modern historians see it instead as evidence that Celsus was not an Epicurean at all. Joseph Wilson Trigg states that Origen probably confused Celsus, the author of The True Word, with a different Celsus, who was an Epicurean philosopher and a friend of the Syrian satirist Lucian. Celsus the Epicurean must have lived around the same time as the author of The True Word and he is mentioned by Lucian in his treatise On Magic. Both Celsus the friend of Lucian and Celsus the author of The True Word evidently shared a passionate zeal against superstitio, making it even easier to see how Origen could have concluded that they were the same person.

Stephen Thomas states that Celsus may not have been a Platonist per se, but that he was clearly familiar with Plato. Celsus's actual philosophy appears to be a blend of elements derived from Platonism, Aristotelianism, Pythagoreanism, and Stoicism. Wilken likewise concludes that Celsus was a philosophical eclectic, whose views reflect a variety of ideas popular to a number of different schools. Wilken classifies Celsus as "a conservative intellectual", noting that "he supports traditional values and defends accepted beliefs". Theologian Robert M. Grant notes that Origen and Celsus actually agree on many points: "Both are opposed to anthropomorphism, to idolatry, and to any crudely literal theology." Celsus also writes as a loyal citizen of the Roman Empire and a devoted believer in Greco-Roman paganism, distrustful of Christianity as new and foreign.

Thomas remarks that Celsus "is no genius as a philosopher". Nonetheless, most scholars, including Thomas, agree that Origen's quotations from The True Word reveal that the work was well-researched. Celsus demonstrates extensive knowledge of both the Old and New Testaments and of both Jewish and Christian history. Celsus was also closely familiar with the literary features of ancient polemics. Celsus seems to have read at least one work by one of the second-century Christian apologists, possibly Justin Martyr or Aristides of Athens. From this reading, Celsus seems to have known which kinds of arguments Christians would be most vulnerable to. He also mentions the Ophites and Simonians, two Gnostic sects that had almost completely vanished by Origen's time. One of Celsus's main sources for Books I–II of The True Word was an earlier anti-Christian polemic written by an unknown Jewish author, whom Origen refers to as the "Jew of Celsus". This Jewish source also provides well-researched criticism of Christianity and, although Celsus was also hostile to Judaism, he occasionally relies on this Jewish author's arguments.

Work

Celsus was the author of a work titled The True Word (Logos Alēthēs). The argument was contested by the contemporary Christian community and the book eventually banned in 448 AD by order of Valentinian III and Theodosius II, along with Porphyry's 15 books attacking the Christians, The Philosophy from Oracles, so no complete copies are extant, but it can be reconstructed from Origen's detailed account of it in his 8 volume refutation, which quotes Celsus extensively. Origen's work has survived and thereby preserved Celsus' work with it.

Celsus seems to have been interested in Ancient Egyptian religion, and he seemed to know of Hellenistic Jewish logos-theology, both of which suggest The True Doctrine was composed in Alexandria. Origen indicates that Celsus was an Epicurean living under the Emperor Hadrian.

Celsus writes that "there is an ancient doctrine [archaios logos] which has existed from the beginning, which has always been maintained by the wisest nations and cities and wise men". He leaves Jews and Moses out of those he cites (Egyptians, Syrians,
Indians, Persians, Odrysians, Samothracians, Eleusinians, Hyperboreans, Galactophagoi, Druids, and Getae), and instead blames Moses for the corruption of the ancient religion: "the goatherds and shepherds who followed Moses as their leader were deluded by clumsy deceits into thinking that there was only one God, [and] without any rational cause ... these goatherds and shepherds abandoned the worship of many gods". However, Celsus' harshest criticism was reserved for Christians, who "wall themselves off and break away from the rest of mankind".

Celsus initiated a critical attack on Christianity, ridiculing many of its dogmas. He wrote that some Jews said Jesus' father was actually a Roman soldier named Pantera. Origen considered this a fabricated story. In addition, Celsus addressed the miracles of Jesus, holding that "Jesus performed his miracles by sorcery (γοητεία)":

Origen wrote his refutation in 248. Sometimes quoting, sometimes paraphrasing, sometimes merely referring, Origen reproduces and replies to Celsus' arguments. Since accuracy was essential to his refutation of The True Doctrine, most scholars agree that Origen is a reliable source for what Celsus said.

Biblical scholar Arthur J. Droge has written that it is incorrect to refer to Celsus' perspective as polytheism. Instead, he was a henotheist, as opposed to the Jewish strict monotheism;  historian Wouter Hanegraaff explains that "the former has room for a hierarchy of lower deities which do not detract from the ultimate unity of the One." Celsus shows himself familiar with the story of Jewish origins. Conceding that Christians are not without success in business (infructuosi in negotiis), Celsus wants them to be good citizens, to retain their own belief but worship the emperors and join their fellow citizens in defending the empire. It is an earnest and striking appeal on behalf of unity and mutual toleration, though centered on submission to the state and military service. One of Celsus' most bitter complaints is of the refusal of Christians to cooperate with civil society, and their contempt for local customs and the ancient religions. The Christians viewed these as idolatrous and inspired by evil spirits, whereas polytheists like Celsus thought of them as the works of the Daemons, or the god's ministers, who ruled mankind in his place to keep him from the pollution of mortality. Celsus attacks the Christians as feeding off faction and disunity, and accuses them of converting the vulgar and ignorant, while refusing to debate wise men. As for their opinions regarding their sacred mission and exclusive holiness, Celsus responds by deriding their insignificance, comparing them to a swarm of bats, or ants creeping out of their nest, or frogs holding a symposium round a swamp, or worms in conventicle in a corner of the mud.  It is not known how many were Christians at the time of Celsus (the Jewish population of the empire may have been about 6.6-10% in a population of 60 million to quote one reference).

References

Bibliography

Sources

Further reading
 Theodor Keim, Gegen die Christen. (1873) [Celsus' wahres Wort], Reprint Matthes & Seitz, München 1991
 Pélagaud, Etude sur Celse (1878)
 K. J. Neumann's edition in Scriptores Graeci qui Christianam impugnaverunt religionem
 article in Hauck-Herzog's Realencyk. für prot. Theol. where a very full bibliography is given
 W. Moeller, History of the Christian Church, i.169 ff.
 Adolf Harnack, Expansion of Christianity, ii. 129 if.
 J. A. Froude, Short Studies, iv.
 Bernhard Pick, "The Attack of Celsus on Christianity," The Monist, Vol. XXI, 1911.
 Des Origenes: Acht Bücher gegen Celsus. Übersetzt von Paul Koetschau. Josef Kösel Verlag. München. 1927.
 Celsus: Gegen die Christen. Übersetzt von Th. Keim (1873) [Celsus' wahres Wort], Reprint Matthes & Seitz, München 1991
 Die »Wahre Lehre« des Kelsos. Übersetzt und erklärt von Horacio E. Lona. Reihe: Kommentar zu frühchristlichen Apologeten (KfA, Suppl.-Vol. 1), hrsg. v. N. Brox, K. Niederwimmer, H. E. Lona, F. R. Prostmeier, J. Ulrich. Verlag Herder, Freiburg u.a. 2005
 "Celsus the Platonist", Catholic Encyclopedia article
 Dr. B.A. Zuiddam, "Old Critics and Modern Theology", Dutch Reformed Theological Journal (South Africa), part xxxvi, number 2, June 1995.
 Stephen Goranson, "Celsus of Pergamum: Locating a Critic of Early Christianity", in D. R. Edwards and C. T. McCollough (eds), The Archaeology of Difference: Gender, Ethnicity, Class and the "Other" in Antiquity: Studies in Honor of Eric M. Meyers (Boston: American Schools of Oriental Research, 2007) (Information Annual of the American Schools of Oriental Research, 60/61).

External links

  Origen's Text on Celsus
 full text of The Arguments of Celsus Against the Christians in Google Books

2nd-century Christianity
2nd-century philosophers
Hellenistic-era philosophers
Pagan anti-Gnosticism
Critics of Christianity
Year of birth missing
Year of death missing